The 2004–05 NBA season was the Raptors' tenth season in the National Basketball Association. A new management team of head coach Sam Mitchell, and General Manager Rob Babcock was hired before the 2004–05 season by the Raptors.  On December 17, 2004, disgruntled All-Star Vince Carter was traded to the New Jersey Nets for Eric Williams, Aaron Williams, and Alonzo Mourning. Mourning would never report to Toronto and he was waived not long after the trade. He later signed with the Miami Heat for his second stint. Guard Alvin Williams missed the entire season due to right knee inflammation. The Raptors finished fourth in the Atlantic Division with a 33–49 record, which was the same record as the previous season. Sophomore star Chris Bosh showed improvement averaging 16.8 points and 8.9 rebounds per game.

This season marked the end of the Vince Carter era and began the Chris Bosh era in Toronto and the Raptors first season without Carter on the roster since the 1997-98 season. Carter, now as a Net, returned to Toronto on April 15, 2005. He was booed by the Toronto crowd during starting lineups and whenever he touched the ball. This tradition continued until 2015, where he has since played for the Phoenix Suns, Orlando Magic, Dallas Mavericks, Memphis Grizzlies, Sacramento Kings, the Atlanta Hawks.

Offseason
In the NBA draft, the Raptors selected Rafael Araújo and Albert Miralles. Miralles was traded to the Miami Heat for Pape Sow and a 2005 2nd round draft pick on draft day. Araújo would only play three seasons in the NBA: two with the Raptors, and one with the Utah Jazz.

Over the offseason, the Raptors signed two free agents. On July 14, they signed Rafer Alston, and on August 18, they signed Loren Woods.

Draft picks

Roster

Roster Notes
 Guard Alvin Williams missed the entire season due to a knee injury.

Regular season

The Raptors started the season well, winning their first three games. On November 9, they lost against the Sacramento Kings, but they would win the next game against the Utah Jazz. the Raptors then suffered a five-game losing streak, which was snapped when they won against the San Antonio Spurs on November 21. They would lose against the Washington Wizards on November 23, and the next day, they would win against the New York Knicks. They would lose two straight games against the Knicks and the Wizards, and they would win their last game of the month of November against the Miami Heat. At the end of November, the Raptors had a 7–9 record.

December was the team's worst month of the season, winning 20% of their games. They started the month with a seven-game losing streak which ended on the 15th with a win against the Minnesota Timberwolves. On the 17th, Vince Carter was traded to the New Jersey Nets for Alonzo Mourning, Aaron Williams, Eric Williams, a 2005 1st round draft pick, and a 2006 1st round draft pick. The same day, the Raptors played against the Indiana Pacers and lost. Aaron Williams, Eric Williams, and Mourning did not play the game due to a pending physical. Ironically, the next game (on December 19) was against the New Jersey Nets. However, Vince Carter did not play in this game. The Raptors beat the Nets 110-99. The next day, the Raptors lost to the Houston Rockets. On December 22, the Raptors beat the Utah Jazz. To end the month, the Raptors went on a 3-game losing streak against the Phoenix Suns, the Los Angeles Lakers, and the Golden State Warriors. At the end of the month, the Raptors had a 10-21 record, and during the month of December, they were 0-10 on the road.

January was the team's best month of the season, and they won eight of the 14 games they played during the month. They won two games in a row against the Orlando Magic and the Sacramento Kings to begin the month, and they lost on January 7 against the Milwaukee Bucks. They once again won two games in a row, beating the Golden State Warriors on the 9th, and the Boston Celtics on the 12th. In the game against the Celtics, Morris Peterson scored a team-season high of 37 points. They were defeated by the Philadelphia 76ers on the 14th. The Raptors then went on a three-game winning streak, which would be ended by a loss against the Wizards on the 21st. They won against the Charlotte Bobcats on the 23rd, and they would end the month with a three-game losing streak. At the end of the month, the Raptors had an 18-27 record.

In February, the team once again won more than 50% of their games played in the month. In every game played during February, either Chris Bosh or Jalen Rose was the team's leading scorer. The team started February by winning two consecutive games: the first against the Indiana Pacers, and the second against the Wizards. The Raptors then lost four games in a row against the Dallas Mavericks, the Cleveland Cavaliers, the Milwaukee Bucks, and the Philadelphia 76ers. On February 11, the team waived Alonzo Mourning. He would sign with the Miami Heat on March 1, marking his second tenure with the Heat. The Raptors won on February 13 against the Los Angeles Clippers, which would be followed by a loss to the Chicago Bulls on the 16th. The team ended the month with a three-game winning streak, and their record at the end of the month was 24-32.

In March, the Raptors won a third of their games played during the month. They started the month with back-to-back losses against the San Antonio Spurs and the Memphis Grizzlies. They then won against the New Orleans Hornets on the 6th. The next day, the Raptors lost to the Dallas Mavericks, which was followed by a win against the Orlando Magic. On the 11th, they lost against the Atlanta Hawks. On the 13th, they won against the 76ers. They lost two consecutive games against the Celtics and the Detroit Pistons. On the 20th, the Raptors won against the Cleveland Cavaliers. The Raptors then lost two straight games against the Chicago Bulls and the 76ers. They won against Atlanta on the 26th, and the Raptors ended the month with two losses against the Miami Heat and the Orlando Magic. At the end of the month, the Raptors' record was 29-42.

In April, the Raptors had a mediocre month. Having a 4-7 record for games played in April, they were successful on the road, but they were unsuccessful at home. Their first game of the month was a win against the Charlotte Bobcats. They would then lose two games against the Pistons and the Grizzlies. On April 8, the Raptors won against the Hawks, which was also followed by two straight losses to the Bulls and the Pacers. On April 12, the Raptors won against the New York Knicks, which was again followed by two consecutive losses, which were to the Nets and the Celtics. In the April 15 home game against the Nets, Vince Carter returned to Toronto to face his former team. As the starting lineups were announced, Carter was booed by Raptors fans. On April 19, the Raptors won against the Milwaukee Bucks, and they lost the last game of the season against the Cleveland Cavaliers on April 20. At the end of the regular season, the Raptors had a 33-49 record, and they missed the playoffs.

Standings

Record vs. opponents

Game log

|- bgcolor="bbffbb"
| 1
| November 3
| Houston
| 
| Chris Bosh (20)
| Rafer Alston, Chris Bosh, Loren Woods (7)
| Rafer Alston (8)
| Air Canada Centre19,800
| 1–0
|- bgcolor="bbffbb"
| 2
| November 5
| Detroit
| 
| Chris Bosh (18)
| Loren Woods (14)
| Vince Carter (5)
| Air Canada Centre15,284
| 2–0
|- bgcolor="bbffbb"
| 3
| November 7
| Portland
| 
| Vince Carter (25)
| Donyell Marshall (9)
| Rafer Alston (8)
| Air Canada Centre13,863
| 3–0
|- bgcolor="ffcccc"
| 4
| November 9
| @ Sacramento
| 
| Rafer Alston, Jalen Rose (15)
| Loren Woods (11)
| Milt Palacio (5)
| ARCO Arena17,317
| 3–1
|- bgcolor="bbffbb"
| 5
| November 10
| @ Utah
| 
| Chris Bosh (20)
| Loren Woods (9)
| Vince Carter (5)
| Delta Center19,683
| 4–1
|- bgcolor="ffcccc"
| 6
| November 12
| @ Seattle
| 
| Chris Bosh (19)
| Chris Bosh (9)
| Rafer Alston (11)
| KeyArena15,702
| 4–2
|- bgcolor="ffcccc"
| 7
| November 13
| @ Portland
| 
| Rafer Alston (27)
| Chris Bosh (8)
| Rafer Alston (7)
| Rose Garden16,362
| 4–3
|- bgcolor="ffcccc"
| 8
| November 16
| @ L.A. Clippers
| 
| Vince Carter (21)
| Chris Bosh (7)
| Rafer Alston (5)
| Staples Center14,985
| 4–4
|- bgcolor="ffcccc"
| 9
| November 17
| @ Denver
| 
| Jalen Rose (30)
| Jérôme Moïso (11)
| Rafer Alston (6)
| Pepsi Center14,818
| 4–5
|- bgcolor="ffcccc"
| 10
| November 19
| Seattle
| 
| Vince Carter (21)
| Chris Bosh, Matt Bonner (7)
| Rafer Alston (7)
| Air Canada Centre16,886
| 4–6
|- bgcolor="bbffbb"
| 11
| November 21
| San Antonio
| 
| Rafer Alston, Chris Bosh (20)
| Chris Bosh (10)
| Rafer Alston (11)
| Air Canada Centre17,264
| 5–6
|- bgcolor="ffcccc"
| 12
| November 23
| @ Washington
| 
| Vince Carter (25)
| Chris Bosh, Loren Woods (10)
| Rafer Alston (13)
| MCI Center14,541
| 5–7
|- bgcolor="bbffbb"
| 13
| November 24
| New York
| 
| Vince Carter (22)
| Loren Woods (10)
| Milt Palacio (7)
| Air Canada Centre18,192
| 6–7
|- bgcolor="ffcccc"
| 14
| November 27
| @ New York
| 
| Vince Carter (19)
| Loren Woods (10)
| Milt Palacio (8)
| Madison Square Garden19,763
| 6–8
|- bgcolor="ffcccc"
| 15
| November 28
| Washington
| 
| Jalen Rose (29)
| Donyell Marshall, Loren Woods (7)
| Rafer Alston (8)
| Air Canada Centre16,121
| 6–9
|- bgcolor="bbffbb"
| 16
| November 30
| @ Miami
| 
| Jalen Rose (24)
| Chris Bosh (10)
| Rafer Alston, Vince Carter (4)
| American Airlines Arena18,993
| 7–9

|- bgcolor="ffcccc"
| 17
| December 1
| @ Orlando
| 
| Vince Carter (21)
| Loren Woods (7)
| Rafer Alston (6)
| TD Waterhouse Centre12,175
| 7–10
|- bgcolor="ffcccc"
| 18
| December 3
| @ Boston
| 
| Jalen Rose (19)
| Donyell Marshall (11)
| Rafer Alston, Milt Palacio (4)
| FleetCenter15,201
| 7–11
|- bgcolor="ffcccc"
| 19
| December 4
| @ Cleveland
| 
| Rafer Alston (20)
| Chris Bosh (10)
| Rafer Alston (10)
| Gund Arena19,205
| 7–12
|- bgcolor="ffcccc"
| 20
| December 6
| @ New Jersey
| 
| Vince Carter (22)
| Donyell Marshall (9)
| Rafer Alston (8)
| Continental Airlines Arena11,227
| 7–13
|- bgcolor="ffcccc"
| 21
| December 8
| @ Detroit
| 
| Donyell Marshall (22)
| Donyell Marshall (15)
| Rafer Alston, Milt Palacio (6)
| The Palace of Auburn Hills22,076
| 7–14
|- bgcolor="ffcccc"
| 22
| December 10
| Denver
| 
| Rafer Alston (25)
| Chris Bosh (8)
| Rafer Alston (8)
| Air Canada Centre17,197
| 7–15
|- bgcolor="ffcccc"
| 23
| December 12
| Miami
| 
| Jalen Rose (25)
| Loren Woods (11)
| Rafer Alston (9)
| Air Canada Centre19,202
| 7–16
|- bgcolor="bbffbb"
| 24
| December 15
| Minnesota
| 
| Chris Bosh (24)
| Chris Bosh (14)
| Morris Peterson (4)
| Air Canada Centre16,888
| 8–16
|- bgcolor="ffcccc"
| 25
| December 17
| @ Indiana
| 
| Jalen Rose (23)
| Loren Woods (9)
| Milt Palacio (6)
| Conseco Fieldhouse15,357
| 8–17
|- bgcolor="bbffbb"
| 26
| December 19
| New Jersey
| 
| Morris Peterson (20)
| Morris Peterson (6)
| Rafer Alston (7)
| Air Canada Centre16,938
| 9–17
|- bgcolor="ffcccc"
| 27
| December 20
| @ Houston
| 
| Chris Bosh (16)
| Donyell Marshall (12)
| Donyell Marshall, Milt Palacio, Eric Williams (4)
| Toyota Center14,241
| 9–18
|- bgcolor="bbffbb"
| 28
| December 22
| Utah
| 
| Donyell Marshall (22)
| Chris Bosh, Donyell Marshall, Eric Williams (8)
| Rafer Alston (14)
| Air Canada Centre17,479
| 10–18
|- bgcolor="ffcccc"
| 29
| December 26
| @ Phoenix
| 
| Jalen Rose (19)
| Donyell Marshall (9)
| Rafer Alston (3)
| America West Arena18,422
| 10–19
|- bgcolor="ffcccc"
| 30
| December 28
| @ L.A. Lakers
| 
| Rafer Alston (13)
| Rafael Araújo, Chris Bosh (10)
| Rafer Alston (11)
| Staples Center18,997
| 10–20
|- bgcolor="ffcccc"
| 31
| December 29
| @ Golden State
| 
| Jalen Rose (23)
| Donyell Marshall (12)
| Rafer Alston (9)
| The Arena in Oakland15,279
| 10–21

|- bgcolor="bbffbb"
| 32
| January 3
| Orlando
| 
| Chris Bosh (25)
| Chris Bosh (12)
| Rafer Alston, Milt Palacio (6)
| Air Canada Centre15,782
| 11–21
|- bgcolor="bbffbb"
| 33
| January 5
| Sacramento
| 
| Chris Bosh (23)
| Rafael Araújo (14)
| Rafer Alston (10)
| Air Canada Centre18,288
| 12–21
|- bgcolor="ffcccc"
| 34
| January 7
| Milwaukee
| 
| Jalen Rose, Eric Williams (21)
| Donyell Marshall (14)
| Rafer Alston (8)
| Air Canada Centre16,537
| 12–22
|- bgcolor="bbffbb"
| 35
| January 9
| Golden State
| 
| Chris Bosh, Morris Peterson (21)
| Chris Bosh (17)
| Rafer Alston (7)
| Air Canada Centre14,372
| 13–22
|- bgcolor="bbffbb"
| 36
| January 12
| Boston
| 
| Morris Peterson (37)
| Chris Bosh (11)
| Rafer Alston, Morris Peterson (6)
| Air Canada Centre15,108
| 14–22
|- bgcolor="ffcccc"
| 37
| January 14
| @ Philadelphia
| 
| Donyell Marshall (20)
| Chris Bosh (13)
| Rafer Alston (13)
| Wachovia Center18,001
| 14–23
|- bgcolor="bbffbb"
| 38
| January 16
| New Orleans
| 
| Morris Peterson (25)
| Chris Bosh, Morris Peterson (10)
| Rafer Alston (7)
| Air Canada Centre14,422
| 15–23
|- bgcolor="bbffbb"
| 39
| January 17
| @ Minnesota
| 
| Donyell Marshall (22)
| Chris Bosh (11)
| Rafer Alston (15)
| Target Center16,632
| 16–23
|- bgcolor="bbffbb"
| 40
| January 19
| New York
| 
| Jalen Rose (24)
| Chris Bosh (14)
| Rafer Alston, Jalen Rose (5)
| Air Canada Centre16,613
| 17–23
|- bgcolor="ffcccc"
| 41
| January 21
| @ Washington
| 
| Jalen Rose (32)
| Morris Peterson (9)
| Rafer Alston (7)
| MCI Center15,424
| 17–24
|- bgcolor="bbffbb"
| 42
| January 23
| Charlotte
| 
| Morris Peterson (26)
| Rafael Araújo, Chris Bosh (8)
| Rafer Alston (8)
| Air Canada Centre14,196
| 18–24
|- bgcolor="ffcccc"
| 43
| January 26
| Miami
| 
| Rafer Alston (29)
| Lamond Murray (8)
| Rafer Alston (8)
| Air Canada Centre19,800
| 18–25
|- bgcolor="ffcccc"
| 44
| January 28
| @ Charlotte
| 
| Rafer Alston (20)
| Jalen Rose (6)
| Jalen Rose (5)
| Charlotte Coliseum15,986
| 18–26
|- bgcolor="ffcccc"
| 45
| January 30
| Phoenix
| 
| Chris Bosh (27)
| Matt Bonner (8)
| Milt Palacio (9)
| Air Canada Centre19,800
| 18–27

|- bgcolor="bbffbb"
| 46
| February 2
| @ Indiana
| 
| Chris Bosh (25)
| Chris Bosh (15)
| Milt Palacio (7)
| Conseco Fieldhouse14,783
| 19–27
|- bgcolor="bbffbb"
| 47
| February 4
| Washington
| 
| Jalen Rose (26)
| Chris Bosh (11)
| Rafer Alston (8)
| Air Canada Centre15,546
| 20–27
|- bgcolor="ffcccc"
| 48
| February 6
| Dallas
| 
| Chris Bosh (29)
| Chris Bosh (8)
| Rafer Alston (8)
| Air Canada Centre17,896
| 20–28
|- bgcolor="ffcccc"
| 49
| February 8
| @ Cleveland
| 
| Jalen Rose (21)
| Loren Woods (9)
| Milt Palacio (9)
| Gund Arena17,036
| 20–29
|- bgcolor="ffcccc"
| 50
| February 9
| Milwaukee
| 
| Jalen Rose (26)
| Chris Bosh (9)
| Rafer Alston (12)
| Air Canada Centre14,269
| 20–30
|- bgcolor="ffcccc"
| 51
| February 11
| Philadelphia
| 
| Jalen Rose (23)
| Jalen Rose (10)
| Chris Bosh, Morris Peterson, Jalen Rose (5)
| Air Canada Centre19,800
| 20–31
|- bgcolor="bbffbb"
| 52
| February 13
| L.A. Clippers
| 
| Chris Bosh (26)
| Chris Bosh (10)
| Rafer Alston (8)
| Air Canada Centre15,721
| 21–31
|- bgcolor="ffcccc"
| 53
| February 16
| Chicago
| 
| Chris Bosh (28)
| Chris Bosh, Jalen Rose (7)
| Rafer Alston (8)
| Air Canada Centre15,881
| 21–32
|- bgcolor="bbffbb"
| 54
| February 22
| @ New Jersey
| 
| Jalen Rose (30)
| Chris Bosh (12)
| Rafer Alston (6)
| Continental Airlines Arena14,080
| 22–32
|- bgcolor="bbffbb"
| 55
| February 25
| @ Milwaukee
| 
| Chris Bosh (27)
| Chris Bosh, Donyell Marshall (8)
| Rafer Alston (7)
| Bradley Center15,883
| 23–32
|- bgcolor="bbffbb"
| 56
| February 27
| L.A. Lakers
| 
| Jalen Rose (26)
| Chris Bosh (15)
| Milt Palacio (7)
| Air Canada Centre19,800
| 24–32

|- bgcolor="ffcccc"
| 57
| March 2
| @ San Antonio
| 
| Chris Bosh (16)
| Donyell Marshall (9)
| Milt Palacio (6)
| SBC Center17,795
| 24–33
|- bgcolor="ffcccc"
| 58
| March 4
| @ Memphis
| 
| Jalen Rose (19)
| Donyell Marshall (9)
| Morris Peterson (4)
| FedExForum18,119
| 24–34
|- bgcolor="bbffbb"
| 59
| March 6
| @ New Orleans
| 
| Chris Bosh (33)
| Chris Bosh (15)
| Milt Palacio (9)
| New Orleans Arena10,638
| 25–34 
|- bgcolor="ffcccc"
| 60
| March 7
| @ Dallas
| 
| Morris Peterson (23)
| Chris Bosh (8)
| Rafer Alston (7)
| American Airlines Center19,509
| 25–35
|- bgcolor="bbffbb"
| 61
| March 9
| Orlando
| 
| Rafer Alston, Morris Peterson (16)
| Chris Bosh (15)
| Jalen Rose (8)
| Air Canada Centre17,362
| 26–35
|- bgcolor="ffcccc"
| 62
| March 11
| Atlanta
| 
| Jalen Rose (22)
| Chris Bosh, Donyell Marshall (11)
| Rafer Alston (11)
| Air Canada Centre17,890
| 26–36
|- bgcolor="bbffbb"
| 63
| March 13
| Philadelphia
| 
| Donyell Marshall (38)
| Chris Bosh, Donyell Marshall (10)
| Morris Peterson (8)
| Air Canada Centre19,800
| 27–36
|- bgcolor="ffcccc"
| 64
| March 16
| @ Boston
| 
| Jalen Rose (35)
| Donyell Marshall (9)
| Rafer Alston (6)
| FleetCenter17,020
| 27–37
|- bgcolor="ffcccc"
| 65
| March 18
| @ Detroit
| 
| Donyell Marshall (25)
| Donyell Marshall (12)
| Rafer Alston, Milt Palacio (4)
| The Palace of Auburn Hills22,076
| 27–38
|- bgcolor="bbffbb"
| 66
| March 20
| Cleveland
| 
| Jalen Rose (30)
| Donyell Marshall (10)
| Rafer Alston (4)
| Air Canada Centre19,800
| 28–38
|- bgcolor="ffcccc"
| 67
| March 23
| Chicago
| 
| Jalen Rose (30)
| Chris Bosh, Jalen Rose (9)
| Rafer Alston (5)
| Air Canada Centre16,974
| 28–39
|- bgcolor="ffcccc"
| 68
| March 25
| @ Philadelphia
| 
| Donyell Marshall (26)
| Chris Bosh (22)
| Rafer Alston (10)
| Wachovia Center18,521
| 28–40
|- bgcolor="bbffbb"
| 69
| March 26
| @ Atlanta
| 
| Chris Bosh (32)
| Chris Bosh (11)
| Milt Palacio (6)
| Philips Arena16,648
| 29–40
|- bgcolor="ffcccc"
| 70
| March 29
| @ Miami
| 
| Rafer Alston (19)
| Chris Bosh (13)
| Rafer Alston, Jalen Rose (6)
| American Airlines Arena20,197
| 29–41
|- bgcolor="ffcccc"
| 71
| March 30
| @ Orlando
| 
| Rafer Alston (17)
| Chris Bosh (11)
| Jalen Rose (5)
| TD Waterhouse Centre12,410
| 29–42

|- bgcolor="bbffbb"
| 72
| April 1
| @ Charlotte
| 
| Chris Bosh (27)
| Donyell Marshall (12)
| Milt Palacio, Morris Peterson, Jalen Rose (4)
| Charlotte Coliseum13,550
| 30–42
|- bgcolor="ffcccc"
| 73
| April 3
| Detroit
| 
| Morris Peterson, Jalen Rose (22)
| Chris Bosh (9)
| Jalen Rose (5)
| Air Canada Centre19,800
| 30–43
|- bgcolor="ffcccc"
| 74
| April 6
| Memphis
| 
| Jalen Rose (19)
| Chris Bosh (10)
| Matt Bonner, Jalen Rose (3)
| Air Canada Centre14,964
| 30–44
|- bgcolor="bbffbb"
| 75
| April 8
| Atlanta
| 
| Jalen Rose (30)
| Morris Peterson (14)
| Rafer Alston (8)
| Air Canada Centre14,352
| 31–44
|- bgcolor="ffcccc"
| 76
| April 9
| @ Chicago
| 
| Jalen Rose (19)
| Chris Bosh (9)
| Rafer Alston (9)
| United Center22,281
| 31–45
|- bgcolor="ffcccc"
| 77
| April 11
| Indiana
| 
| Jalen Rose (26)
| Chris Bosh (13)
| Rafer Alston (9)
| Air Canada Centre15,104
| 31–46
|- bgcolor="bbffbb"
| 78
| April 12
| @ New York
| 
| Chris Bosh (29)
| Rafer Alston (9)
| Rafer Alston (7)
| Madison Square Garden18,907
| 32–46
|- bgcolor="ffcccc"
| 79
| April 15
| New Jersey
| 
| Jalen Rose (20)
| Morris Peterson (8)
| Rafer Alston (7)
| Air Canada Centre19,800
| 32–47
|- bgcolor="ffcccc"
| 80
| April 17
| Boston
| 
| Jalen Rose (31)
| Chris Bosh, Pape Sow (7)
| Rafer Alston (6)
| Air Canada Centre18,797
| 32–48
|- bgcolor="bbffbb"
| 81
| April 19
| @ Milwaukee
| 
| Jalen Rose (29)
| Pape Sow (9)
| Omar Cook (10)
| Bradley Center13,947
| 33–48
|- bgcolor="ffcccc"
| 82
| April 20
| Cleveland
| 
| Jalen Rose (25)
| Morris Peterson (9)
| Omar Cook (9)
| Air Canada Centre19,800
| 33–49

Player statistics

Regular season

* Statistics include only games with the Raptors

Transactions

Trades

Free agents

Award winners
 Chris Bosh, NBA All-Star Rookie-Sophomore Game Appearance (Sophomore)

References

External links
 
 

Toronto Raptors seasons
Toronto
Tor